uccc, UCCC, or variation, may refer to:

 Ulster County Community College, a former name of SUNY Ulster in New York, United States
 Union Colony Civic Center, Greeley, Colorado, United States
 Uniform Consumer Credit Code, a code of conduct for payday loans in Australia
 United Christian Community Church, a church established be by the United Christian College, Hong Kong

See also
 UC3 (disambiguation)
 UC (disambiguation)